Toshiji is a masculine Japanese given name.

Possible writings
Toshiji can be written using different combinations of kanji characters. Some examples:

敏次, "agile, next"
敏二, "agile, two"
敏治, "agile, to manage/cure"
敏児, "agile, child"
敏爾, "agile, you"
敏慈, "agile, mercy"
敏司, "agile, administer"
俊次, "talented, next"
俊二, "talented, two"
俊治, "talented, to manage/cure"
俊児, "talented, child"
俊爾, "talented, you"
俊慈, "talented, mercy"
俊司, "talented, administer"
利次, "benefit, next"
利二, "benefit, two"
利治, "benefit, to manage/cure"
利児, "benefit, child"
利爾, "benefit, you"
利司, "benefit, administer"
年次, "year, next"
年二, "year, two"
寿次, "long life, next"
寿二, "long life, two"

The name can also be written in hiragana としじ or katakana トシジ.

Notable people with the name
Toshiji Eda (江田 利児, born 1937), Japanese rower.
Toshiji Fukuda (福田 俊司, born 1948), Japanese photographer.
Toshiji Kimikaze (皇風 俊司, born 1986), real name Toshiji Naoe (直江 俊司), Japanese sumo wrestler.

Japanese masculine given names